Media Madness: Donald Trump, the Press, and the War Over the Truth is a book by Howard Kurtz, released on January 29, 2018. The book details Donald Trump's ongoing fights with the news media during the first year of his presidency.

References

2018 non-fiction books
American non-fiction books
Biographies about politicians
Books about the Trump administration
English-language books
Regnery Publishing books

Books about Donald Trump